Jamaica is an unincorporated community in Jamaica Township, Vermilion County, Illinois.

History
Like so many other small towns in the late 19th century, Jamaica developed because of the railroads. When the C&EI railroad came through the township, Jamaica thrived.  However, when the Fairmount quarries closed, the town began to dwindle. It is now a small unincorporated area. School consolidation led to the new school being built near the town to replace the older Fairmount, Indianola, and Sidell high schools, and it was called Jamaica High School.

Geography

References

Unincorporated communities in Vermilion County, Illinois
Unincorporated communities in Illinois